Eclipta (beetle), a genus of insects in the family Cerambycidae
Eclipta (plant), a genus of plants in the family Asteraceae